avenir slimène

Hedi Khalfa (born 16 January 1994) is a Tunisian football defender who currently plays for US Monastir.

References

1994 births
Living people
Tunisian footballers
AS Gabès players
Olympique Béja players
US Tataouine players
US Monastir (football) players
Association football defenders
Tunisian Ligue Professionnelle 1 players